

Oman
 Mombasa – Sa‘id al-Hadermi, Wali of Mombasa (1735–1739)

Portugal
 Angola – Rodrigo César de Meneses, Governor of Angola (1733–1738)
 Macau –
 Antonio de Amaral Meneses, Governor of Macau (1732–1735)
 D.Joao do Casal, Governor of Macau (1735)
 Cosme Damiao Pinto Pereira, Governor of Macau (1735–1738)

Colonial governors
Colonial governors
1735